Victor Dillard (1897–1945) was a French Jesuit, a hero of the French Resistance during World War II, He attempted to organize the French compulsory workers deported to Germany, but was arrested and died in Dachau.

Works
Victor Dillard, Lettres du prisonnier inconnu, Sainte-Foy-lès-Lyon, Le monde ouvrier, 1941
Victor Dillard, Suprêmes témoignages, Paris, Spes, coll. « Action populaire  », 1945

Further reading
Robert Dillard, La vie et la mort du R.P. Dillard, Les œuvres françaises, 1947
Philippe Verrier (postface Charles Molette), Le P. Victor Dillard, jésuite, mort à Dachau en 1945, "L'un des cinquante", Magny-les-Hameaux, Socéval Éditions/Artège, juillet 2005
Jean-Marie Mayer/Yves-Marie Hilaire: Dictionnaire du Monde religieux dans la France Contemporaine. Paris 1985, p. 95

External links
  Victor Dillard (French)

1897 births
1945 deaths
20th-century French Jesuits
French people who died in Dachau concentration camp
Resistance members who died in Nazi concentration camps